Alexander Overwijk is a Canadian math teacher who went viral for his claim of being able to hand-draw a perfect circle.

Career
Overwijk is the former head of the math department at Glebe Collegiate Institute in Ottawa, Canada. He is also a former basketball player and coach at Carleton University, and was inducted into the Lindsay, Ontario Sports Hall of Fame.

Overwijk is known for his active and experimental teaching style.

Viral fame
Beginning in 1996, to keep his class engaged, Overwijk would tell his students a story about being the "World Freehand Circle Drawing Champion." To further his claim, he would hand-draw a circle on the blackboard. In 2007, a video of Overwijk drawing a near-perfect circle for his class went viral on YouTube. Although the original story was a fabrication, he hosted a real "World Freehand Circle Drawing Championship" as a fundraiser for the Canadian Cancer Society following his viral fame.

In 2012, Overwijk and his circle-drawing abilities were featured on The Today Show. In 2018, a professor of the Department of Mathematics at Stockholm University found the drawing from the 2007 video to have a circularness of 99.7%.

References

Further reading

Canadian educators
Canadian basketball coaches
Year of birth missing (living people)
Living people